The Student Yachting World Cup (SYWoC) is an annual sailing competition for students which was created in 1979 and is held in France.

36th edition 

The 36th edition of the Student Yachting World Cup took place in La Rochelle, France. The competitors sailed from November 2 to November 7 on Grand Surprise class sailboats.

The Student Yachting World Cup

The SYWoC is an annual sailing competition organized by students at the École Polytechnique, a French engineering school, seeing the world's best student sailing teams confront each other in a week-long series of races. Every year, the SYWoC takes place around All Saints' Day and gather about 200 students in a large French harbour. Earlier editions have taken place in La Rochelle, Lorient, Royan, Marseille, La Trinité-sur-Mer, Toulon.

Each country can be represented one team. This team is chosen on the basis of its national or international races, as well as on advice from the national sailing federation. The winner of the last edition and the Ecole Polytechnique, organizing university, are also invited.

The World Cup is composed of several regattas, usually between 10 and 15, taking place during the whole week. The crews sail on Grand Surprise, a profile boat built for competition. The regattas are of "banana" or coastal type. A night regatta, starting in the afternoon and ending after nightfall, is also organised during the competition. An international jury arbitrate the regattas.

Two prizes are awarded every year:
 AGPM Trophy: Besides the general ranking, the competition provides an “inshore” ranking, determined from the inshore races. The winner of the ranking is awarded the AGPM trophy.
 Student Yachting World Cup: the winner of the regattas is awarded the Student Yachting World Cup which he shall bring back into play for the following edition.

History

The Student Yachting World Cup, former Course de l'Europe, has been organized since 1979 by students at the École Polytechnique. Each year, the best sailing teams from universities all around the world meet and compete in thrilling yacht races.

When the "Course de l'Europe" was created in 1979, only a few European countries participated. Other teams have joined in, from Eastern Europe, Japan, the United States or Australia, thus making it a real World Cup.

The race changed its name to "Student Yachting World Cup" and became the only competition to deliver the ISAF title of "Student Yachting World Champion". Today, between 15 and 20 teams, from Europe, America, Asia and Australia, compete each year for the title.

Past winners

External links

Ecole Polytechnique institutional website

Annual sporting events in France
1979 establishments in France
Collegiate sailing competitions
ParisTech
Recurring sporting events established in 1979
Sailing competitions in France